Dania Hall was a historic gathering place for people of Danish heritage in Racine, Wisconsin. Located at 1019 State Street, it was built by Society Dania, an organization formed in 1867 to aid Danish immigrants in learning language and customs. The structure, completed in 1876, featured a large meeting room, where there were dinners, dances and performances by the Singing Society and Dania Dramatic Club. In the early years the facility also had a Danish school and library. In 1976 it was the site of a reception for Queen Margrethe II of Denmark, and Prince Henrik.

There were Dania Halls in other parts of the country, including 
Hudson, Wisconsin; Minneapolis, Minnesota; Livermore, California and Modesto, California.

References

External links
Racine, Wisconsin
Dania Hall 01
Dania Hall 02
Dania Hall 03
Other locations
Dania Hall: Hudson, WI
Dania Hall: Livermore, CA
Dania Hall: Minneapolis, MN
Dania Hall: Modesto, CA 

Buildings and structures completed in 1876
Buildings and structures in Racine, Wisconsin
Clubhouses in Wisconsin
Danish-American culture in Wisconsin
Danish migration to North America